Paolo Magnani (born 31 December 1926) is an Italian prelate in the Roman Catholic Church who is the emeritus bishop of the Diocese of Treviso.

Biography 

He was ordained a priest on 29 June 1951.

He was appointed bishop of Lodi on 27 July 1977.
Magnani received his episcopal consecration on September 10 following on from cardinal Antonio Poma.

He was appointed bishop of Treviso on 19 November 1988 and was installed in the diocese on 11 February 1989.

He replaced the previous bishop of Treviso Antonio Mistrorigo and took retirement on 3 December 2003.

Photo gallery

Resources
 Profile of Mons. Magnani
 Sito della Diocese of Treviso

1926 births
Living people
People from the Province of Pavia
Bishops of Lodi
Bishops of Treviso
20th-century Italian Roman Catholic priests